Plestiodon dicei, or Dice's short-nosed skink, is a species of lizard which is endemic to Mexico. It was named in honor of Lee R. Dice, who collected the holotype in 1930  while conducting a faunal survey in the Sierra de San Carlos, Tamaulipas, Mexico. It was considered a subspecies of Plestiodon brevirostris for many decades. Plestiodon dicei occurs in northeastern Mexico, in the Sierra Madre Oriental in Coahuila, Nuevo Leon, San Luis Potosi, and Tamaulipas, with isolated populations in the Sierra de San Carlos and the Sierra de Tamaulipas.

References

Further reading
 Ruthven, Alexander G. & Helen T. Gaige 1933. A new skink from Mexico. Occasional Papers of the Museum of Zoology, University of Michigan, 260: 1–3. 
 Axtell, Ralph W. 1960. A New Subspecies of Eumeces dicei from the Sierra Madre of Northeastern Mexico. Copeia, 1960(1): 19–26.
 Dixon, James R. 1969. Taxonomic Review of the Mexican Skinks of the Eumeces brevirostris Group. Contributions in Science. No. 168: 1-30.
 Feria-Ortiz, Manuel, Norma L. Manríquez-Morán, and Adrián Nieto-Montes de Oca. 2011. Species limits based on MTDNA and morphological data in the polotypic species Plestiodon brevirostris (Squamata: Scincidae). Herpetological Monographs 25: 25–51. 

dicei
Endemic reptiles of Mexico
Fauna of the Sierra Madre Oriental
Reptiles described in 1933
Taxa named by Alexander Grant Ruthven
Taxa named by Helen Beulah Thompson Gaige